The Linguist (formerly The Incorporated Linguist) is the bimonthly journal of the UK's Chartered Institute of Linguists. The headquarters is in London.

History and profile
The journal was established in 1962. The Linguist includes news about CIOL, articles on translation and interpreting, bilingualism and language use, as well as book reviews and current opinions.

The editor is Miranda Moore. The late Professor Peter Newmark was a regular contributor, whose wide-ranging column was entitled "Translation Now", as was Andrew Dalby with "Notes in the Margin".

References

External links 
 Institute website
 The Linguist

Science and technology magazines published in the United Kingdom
Bi-monthly magazines published in the United Kingdom
Linguistics journals
Magazines published in London
Magazines established in 1962